William Cooke (died 14 May 1589), was an English politician.

William Cooke was the son of Sir Anthony Cooke of Gidea Hall, Essex, and Anne Fitzwilliam, the daughter of Sir William Fitzwilliam, Master of the Worshipful Company of Merchant Taylors and Sheriff of London, by his first wife, Anne Hawes, daughter of Sir John Hawes, by whom he had four sons and five daughters:

His paternal grandparents were John Cooke (d. 10 October 1515), esquire, of Gidea Hall, Essex, and Alice Saunders (d. 1510), daughter and coheiress of William Saunders of Banbury, Oxfordshire by Jane Spencer, daughter of John Spencer, esquire, of Hodnell, Warwickshire.

He was a Member (MP) of the Parliament of England for Stamford in 1559 and Grantham in 1563.

He married Frances Grey, daughter of Lord John Grey of Pirgo and Mary Browne, by whom he had four sons, including Sir Richard Cooke, Secretary of State for Ireland, and William Cooke of Highnam, Gloucestershire, who married Joyce Lucy, granddaughter of Sir Thomas Lucy of Charlecote, and three daughters.

Notes

References
 

Year of birth missing
1589 deaths
English MPs 1559
English MPs 1563–1567